Saulo Batista de Andrade Cordeiro (born 19 November 1979), simply known as Saulo, is a retired Brazilian footballer who played as a midfielder.

Honours
CRB
Campeonato Alagoano: 2002

Criciúma
Campeonato Catarinense: 2005

References

External links
 IG Esporte profile 
 Meu Time na Rede profile 
 

1979 births
Living people
Sportspeople from Recife
Brazilian footballers
Association football midfielders
Campeonato Brasileiro Série A players
Campeonato Brasileiro Série B players
Sociedade Esportiva do Gama players
Clube de Regatas Brasil players
Criciúma Esporte Clube players
Treze Futebol Clube players
América Futebol Clube (RN) players
Itumbiara Esporte Clube players
Fortaleza Esporte Clube players
União São João Esporte Clube players
Marília Atlético Clube players
Clube Atlético Juventus players